Now and On Earth is a 1942 novel by Jim Thompson. It was his first published novel.

Plot
Set in San Diego during World War II, it is a semi-autobiographical novel of the author's life working in an airplane manufacturing plant during the war years and the frustrations he endured there and in his personal life at the time. The main character is named James Dillon, a pen name under which Thompson previously published short stories.

References

1942 American novels
Novels by Jim Thompson
Novels set during World War II
Novels set in San Diego
American autobiographical novels
1942 debut novels